Kew Raffique Jaliens (born 15 September 1978) is a Dutch former footballer who played as a defender.

Club career

Sparta
Kew Jaliens started his career at Sparta and made his league debut at age of 18 in a 2–1 away win over FC Groningen on 25 May 1997. In the following 1997–98 season, Jaliens became a regular in the starting lineup. He finished his career at Sparta with 68 league appearances scoring 4 goals.

Willem II
Jaliens signed for Willem II in 1999 and made his league debut on 28 August in a match against FC Den Bosch. He scored his first goal on 3 February 2001 in a match against FC Twente Enschede.

AZ

In 2004 Jaliens signed for AZ and made his league debut in a 1–1 draw with SC Heerenveen on 14 August. He scored his first goal for AZ on 16 March 2005 in a match against Vitesse Arnhem. In July 2007 he signed a contract extension to 2012, with AZ director of football Marcel Brands, who described him as a "cornerstone of the team". Jaliens took a part in winning the Eredivisie and Dutch Super Cup in 2009.

Wisła Kraków
On 26 January 2011, Jaliens joined Polish Ekstraklasa side Wisła Kraków on a free transfer from AZ. He signed a two and a half year deal. Jaliens won the Ekstraklasa championship in his debut season.

Newcastle Jets
On 15 August 2013, it was announced that Jaliens had signed with Australian club Newcastle Jets.

On 4 August 2014, Jaliens was named as captain of the Newcastle Jets for the upcoming 2014–15 season.

Jaliens was reportedly sacked from the Jets by owner Nathan Tinkler following a player revolt midway through the 2014–15 A-League season.

Melbourne City
Barely two weeks after his departure from Newcastle, Jaliens joined A-League rival Melbourne City on an injury replacement short-term contract. Subsequently, Jaliens netted one of the winning goals in his first appearance against his former club, Newcastle Jets.

International career

In 2006 Jaliens received a call-up from Marco van Basten and made his debut for the senior side against Ecuador.

He was selected for the 23-man Netherlands squad for the 2006 FIFA World Cup finals that were held in Germany. Jaliens played one game in the tournament against Argentina which Netherlands kept a clean sheet.

Jaliens has represented the Netherlands 10 times.

Beijing Olympics
Jaliens was selected as one of the three over aged players in the Netherlands football team at the 2008 Summer Olympics in Beijing. Jaliens played in all three group stage games in the tournament against United States, Japan and Nigeria, but missed the quarterfinal loss against Argentina due to yellow cards ban.

Personal life
He was born on 15 September 1978 to Imro and Carmen Jaliens. He is the nephew of Kenneth Jaliens, the technical director of the Surinamese national team.

Career statistics

1 – includes A-League final series statistics

Honours
AZ
Eredivisie: 2008–09
Dutch Super Cup: 2009

Wisła Kraków
Ekstraklasa: 2010–11

References

External links

1978 births
Living people
Dutch footballers
Netherlands international footballers
Netherlands under-21 international footballers
Dutch expatriate footballers
Eredivisie players
Ekstraklasa players
A-League Men players
Sparta Rotterdam players
AZ Alkmaar players
Willem II (football club) players
Wisła Kraków players
Newcastle Jets FC players
Melbourne City FC players
Expatriate footballers in Poland
Expatriate soccer players in Australia
2006 FIFA World Cup players
Footballers from Rotterdam
Dutch sportspeople of Surinamese descent
Olympic footballers of the Netherlands
Footballers at the 2008 Summer Olympics
Association football defenders